The Sir John Sulman Prize is one of Australia's longest-running art prizes, having been established in 1936.

It is now held concurrently with the Archibald Prize, Australia's best-known art prize, and also with the Wynne Prize, at the Art Gallery of New South Wales (AGNSW), Sydney.

Criteria

The Sir John Sulman Prize is awarded each year for "the best subject/genre painting and/or murals/mural project executed during the two years preceding the [closing] date", and as of 2008 is valued at $20,000. Media may be acrylic, oil, watercolour or mixed media, and applicants must have been resident in Australia for five years.

The definition of the terms as given by the AGNSW is: 
A genre painting is normally a composition representing some aspect or aspects of everyday life, and may feature figurative, still-life, interior or figure-in-landscape themes. A subject painting, in contrast to a genre painting, is idealised or dramatised. Typically, a subject painting takes its theme from history, poetry, mythology or religion. In both cases, however, the style may be figurative, representative, abstract or semi-abstract. A mural is a picture that is affixed directly to a wall or ceiling, as part of an architectural and/or decorative scheme.

List of winners
Source:
1940 – Harold Abbott – Vaucluse Interior (painting)
1941 – Douglas Annand – Historical Mural at Bathurst Public School
1942 – Jean Bellette – For Whom the Bell Tolls (painting)
1943 – Elaine Haxton – Mural at le Coq D'Or Restaurant, Sydney
1944 – Jean Bellette – Iphigenia in Tauris (painting)
1945 – Virgil Lo Schiavo – Tribute to Shakespeare, Mural at Sydney University Union
1946 – Sali Herman – Natives carrying wounded soldiers (painting)
1947 – Douglas Annand – Mural, Messrs. Jantzen (Aust.) Pty. Ltd., Lidcombe.
1948 – Sali Herman – The Drovers (painting)
1949 – J. Carrington Smith – Bush Pastoral, Mural design for New State Building, Hobart
1950 – Harold Greenhill – Summer Holiday (painting)
1951 – Douglas Annand – Mural, Restaurant, R.M.S. "Oronsay"
1952 – Charles Doutney – Darlinghurst Road (painting)
1953 – Eric Smith – Convicts Berrima 1839, Mural at Old Court House, Berrima
1954 – Wallace Thornton – Sculptor and Model (painting)
1955 – Wesley Penberthy – Oriental Mural (mural design)
1956 – Harold Greenhill – Prawning at Night (genre painting)
1957 – Michael Kmit – The Voice of Silence (subject painting)
1958 – No Award
1959 – Susan Wright – The Circus (genre painting)
1960 – Leonard French – The Burial (subject painting)
1961 – Robin Norling – Sea Movement and Rocks (mural design)
1962 – John Rigby – Children Dancing (genre painting)
1963 – Roy Fluke – Spring Walk (subject painting)
1964 – Ken Reinhard – The Private Public Preview (genre painting)
1965 – Gareth Jones-Roberts – Grape-pickers and Vineyards (subject painting)
1966 – Louis James – It's Hot in Town (genre painting)
1967 – Cec Burns – Exercise in Variegation (subject painting)
1968 – Tim Storrier – Suzy 350 (genre painting)
1969 – Louis James – Spyhole (subject painting)
1970 – Michael Kmit – Philopena (genre painting)
1971 – James Meldrum – Pyramid Shelf (subject painting)
1972 – Peter Powditch – Sun-torso 128 (Bunch) (genre painting)
1973 – Eric Smith – The Painter Transmogrified and Mrs. Smith (subject painting)
1974 – Keith Looby – Still Life and Comfy II 
1975 – (joint) Alan Oldfield Transvestite (for Diane Arbus)
1975 – (joint) Geoffrey Proud – Untitled Jane
1976 – Brett Whiteley – Interior with time past
1977 – Salvatore Zofrea- Woman's life, woman's love 3
1978 – Brett Whiteley – Yellow Nude
1979 – Salvatore Zofrea – The water trap (subject painting)
1980 – Brian Dunlop – The old physics building (genre painting)
1981 – William Delafield Cook – A French family (subject painting)
1982 – Salvatore Zofrea – Psalm 24 (genre)
1984 – Tim Storrier – The Burn
1986 – Wendy Sharpe – Black Sun – Morning and Night, Nigel Thomson – The State Institution
1987 – Marcus Beilby – Crutching the Ewes, Bob Marchant – The Grand Parade Sydney Show
1988 – Bob Marchant – Catching rabbits and yabbies at 5-mile dam 
1989 – John Olsen – Don Quixote Enters the Inn
1990 – Robert Hollingworth – Going Away/Looking Back
1991/92 – Kevin Connor – Najaf (Iraq) June 1991
1992/93 – John Montefiore – Life Series
1993/94 – Noel McKenna –  Boy Dressed as Batman 2 (Diptych)
1995 – Juli Haas – By the Banks of Her Own Lagoon
1996 – Aida Tomescu – Grey-to-Grey
1997 – Kevin Connor – The Man with itchy fingers and other figures Gare du Nord
1998 – Robert Jacks – Changed into a weeping willow
1999 – Anne Wallace – Secret Paintings
2000 – John Peart – Snailsnake
2001 – Euan Macleod – Exquisite Corpse with Fire, Highly commended: Elisabeth Cummings Harbour Light
2002 – Guan Wei – Gazing into deep space no. 9
2003 – Eric Smith – Reflection
2004  – Allan Mitelman –  Untitled
2005 – Sandro Nocentini –  :File:SandroNocentini MySonHasTwoMothers2005.jpg#filelinks
2006 – Jiawei Shen – Peking treaty 1901 
2007 – David Disher – Axis of Elvis
2008 – Rodney Pople – Stage fright
2009 – Ivan Durrant – ANZAC Day Match
2010 – Michael Lindeman – Paintings, prints & wall hangings
2011 – Peter Smeeth – The artist's fate
2012 – Nigel Milsom – Judo House pt 4 (Golden mud) 
2013 – Victoria Reichelt – After (books)
2014 – Andrew Sullivan – T-rex (tyrant lizard king)
2015 – Jason Phu – I was at yum cha when in rolled the three severed heads of Buddha: fear, malice and death
2016 – Esther Stewart – Flatland dreaming
2017 – Joan Ross – Oh history, you lied to me
2018 – Kaylene Whiskey – Kaylene TV
2020 – Marikit Santiago – The divine
2021 – Georgia Spain – Getting down or falling up
2022 – Claire Healy and Sean Cordeiro – Raiko and Shuten-dōji

Notes and references

External links
Art Gallery of New South Wales – Sir John Sulman Prize
Lionel Hornibrook Jago – Sulman Prize finalist

Australian art awards
Awards established in 1936
1936 establishments in Australia